The Cameleon IV440 is a four-wheel drive modular mission system vehicle designed by Jez Hermer MBE, CEO of OVIK Special Vehicles.  Designed and developed in 2010, it is based upon the IVECO Daily 4x4 chassis but incorporates a number of modifications designed by OVIK plus a range of specialist mission modules which can be interchanged rapidly, giving the vehicle a multi-functional utility.

Concept of use
The general concept behind the Cameleon system is to provide military forces, civil and emergency services and commercial users with a modular vehicle which can be rapidly reconfigured into a range of configurations.

References

External links
 cameleon-mms.com

Iveco
Wheeled combat vehicles
Off-road vehicles